Diplocentria is a genus of dwarf spiders that was first described by J. E. Hull in 1911.

Species
 it contains eight species:
Diplocentria bidentata (Emerton, 1882) (type) – North America, Europe, Russia (Europe to Far East), China
Diplocentria changajensis Wunderlich, 1995 – Mongolia
Diplocentria forsslundi Holm, 1939 – Sweden
Diplocentria hiberna (Barrows, 1945) – USA
Diplocentria mediocris (Simon, 1884) – Europe
Diplocentria perplexa (Chamberlin & Ivie, 1939) – USA, Canada
Diplocentria rectangulata (Emerton, 1915) – North America, Europe, Russia (Europe to Far East)
Diplocentria retinax (Crosby & Bishop, 1936) – USA, Canada

See also
 List of Linyphiidae species

References

Araneomorphae genera
Linyphiidae
Spiders of Asia
Spiders of North America